Alexander Campbell Hunter (27 September 1895 – January 1984) was a Scottish professional footballer who played as a goalkeeper for Queen's Park, Tottenham Hotspur, Wigan Borough and New Bedford Whalers.

Football career
Born in Renfrew, Hunter began his career with local club Renfrew Juniors before joining Queens Park. He joined Tottenham Hotspur and was a member of the 1921 FA Cup Final-winning side. Hunter featured in 26 matches in all competitions for the Lilywhites. After leaving White Hart Lane in 1922 he moved on to Wigan Borough, where he played in a further 39 games. Hunter briefly returned to Scotland to play for Armadale before ending his career with American Soccer League team New Bedford Whalers.

Honours
Tottenham Hotspur
 FA Cup: 1921

References

1895 births
1984 deaths
People from Renfrew
Footballers from Renfrewshire
Scottish footballers
Renfrew F.C. players
Queen's Park F.C. players
English Football League players
Scottish Football League players
Scottish Junior Football Association players
Association football goalkeepers
Tottenham Hotspur F.C. players
Wigan Borough F.C. players
Armadale F.C. players
New Bedford Whalers players
American Soccer League (1921–1933) players
Scottish expatriate sportspeople in the United States
Expatriate soccer players in the United States
Scottish expatriate footballers
Scottish emigrants to the United States
FA Cup Final players